The Foellinger–Freimann Botanical Conservatory is an enclosed conservatory in downtown Fort Wayne, Indiana, United States. The gardens display over 1,200 plants of 502 different species and 72 types of cactus.

Gallery

See also
List of parks in Fort Wayne, Indiana
List of botanical gardens and arboretums in Indiana

References

External links

Botanical gardens in Indiana
Culture of Fort Wayne, Indiana
Tourist attractions in Fort Wayne, Indiana
Protected areas established in 1983
1983 establishments in Indiana
Greenhouses in Indiana